The Prodigal Son (German: Der verlorene Sohn) is a 1934 German drama film directed by Luis Trenker and starring Trenker, Maria Andergast and Bertl Schultes. A South Tyrolean immigrates to New York City, but ultimately finding the U.S. is not for him, returns to his home village.

It was made by the German branch of Universal Pictures.

Cast 
 Luis Trenker as Tonio Feuersinger
 Maria Andergast as Barbl Gudauner
 Bertl Schultes as Barbl's father
 Marian Marsh as Lilian Williams
 F.W. Schröder-Schrom as Mr. Williams
 Jimmie Fox as Hobby
 Paul Henckels as the Teacher
 Eduard Köck as Tonio's father
 Melanie Horeschowsky as Rosina Unverdorben
 Emmerich Albert, Hans Jamnig, and Luis Gerold as Lumberjacks
 Lore Schuetzendorf as Rauhnacht maiden
 Lucie Euler as the Landlady
 Borwin Walth as the Butler

References

Bibliography 
 Hake, Sabine. Popular Cinema of the Third Reich. University of Texas Press, 2001.

External links 
 

1934 films
Films of Nazi Germany
German drama films
German black-and-white films
1934 drama films
1930s German-language films
Films about immigration to the United States
Films directed by Luis Trenker
Films based on Austrian novels
Films based on Italian novels
Films set in the United States
1930s German films
Anti-American sentiment in Germany